"Heart and Soul" is a song written by Mike Chapman and Nicky Chinn and made famous by Huey Lewis and the News.  The song was first recorded by Exile in 1981 as the title track of their album Heart and Soul. Exile's single failed to crack the Billboard Hot 100, peaking at No. 102 on the Bubbling Under Hot 100 Singles chart.  The song was also recorded by the BusBoys for their 1982 album American Worker.

The BusBoys version
In 1982, American rock and roll band the BusBoys covered the song for their album American Worker. Their version is a mix of both rock and funk.

Huey Lewis and the News version
Huey Lewis and the News' version was released as the first single from the album Sports in 1983. The single peaked at number 8 on the U.S. Billboard Hot 100 that November and number one on the Billboard Top Rock Tracks chart. It was nominated for a Grammy Award for Best Rock Vocal, Group at the 26th Annual Grammy Awards in 1984.

Former band member Chris Hayes later remarked, "I don't know why HEART & SOUL sounds so good. Usually we have to re-do all the guitar parts - this time it worked out the first time. I had a Marshall amp in a tiny room, played my Les Paul and it was great!"

Music video
The music video featured Lewis looking for, and leaving with, a woman in a dance club, with Lewis concert footage spliced in. Portions of the video are filmed at Potrero Hill, a neighborhood in San Francisco. Lewis liked Potrero Hill because it "looked very San Francisco". Actress Signy Coleman plays the woman Lewis is chasing after in the dance club. Coleman also appears in the music video for "I Want a New Drug".

In 2013, Coleman reflected on her casting:

Charts 

Weekly charts

Year-end charts

See also
List of Billboard Mainstream Rock number-one songs of the 1980s

References

1981 songs
1981 singles
1983 singles
Exile (American band) songs
Huey Lewis and the News songs
Songs written by Mike Chapman
Songs written by Nicky Chinn
Chrysalis Records singles
Warner Records singles